The Withlacoochee River originates in Georgia, northwest of Nashville, Georgia. It flows south through Berrien County where it joins the New River and forms part of the boundary between Berrien and Cook counties. It then flows south into Lowndes County, Georgia. At Troupville, Georgia the Little River joins the Withlacoochee River flows continues to flow south and forms part of the boundary between Lowndes and Brooks counties in Georgia. The river then flows into Florida for 1.34 miles before returning into Georgia for an additional 2.44 miles. It then returns to Florida, forming the northeast boundary of Madison County, Florida and the western boundary of Hamilton County, Florida and eventually merges with the Suwannee at Suwannee River State Park west of Live Oak. It is believed to be the source for the name of the central Florida river of the same name.

Etymology
The Withlacoochee River received its name from the Muskogean peoples who inhabited South Georgia. It comes from the compound Creek word ue-rakkuce [IPA: ], from ue "water", rakko "big", and -uce "small", with the rough translation "little river." English speakers then changed the Muskogee voiceless lateral spelled r to "thl".

Crossings

Notes

External links

 Withlacoochee River (North) Canoe Trail at Florida Department of Environmental Protection
 Rivers that flow north at EcoFlorida
 Withlacoochee River (North): Georgia State Line to Suwannee River State Park at Trails.com

Rivers of Georgia (U.S. state)
Rivers of Florida
Rivers of Brooks County, Georgia
Rivers of Berrien County, Georgia
Rivers of Cook County, Georgia
Bodies of water of Suwannee County, Florida
Rivers of Lowndes County, Georgia
Tributaries of the Suwannee River